Vered Tochterman (born October 24, 1970) is an Israeli author, translator and editor of science fiction and fantasy. Among her work is a short story collection, Lifamim Ze Acheret (Sometimes It's Different), (Opus press, 2002), for whom she received the Israeli Geffen Award in 2003 as well as an array of short stories published in various magazines in Israel. Several of them were the winners of the ISSF short stories contest over the years.

Tochterman edited the Israeli SF&F magazine Chalomot Be'aspamia (“Idle dreams”) in the years 2002-2006.

One of her stories, Hunting a Unicorn, appeared in the December 2003 issue of The Magazine of Fantasy & Science Fiction.

References

1970 births
Living people
Israeli science fiction writers
Israeli women writers
Women science fiction and fantasy writers
University of Haifa alumni